Neustädter Kirche may refer to several churches in Germany:

 Neustädter Kirche, Erlangen
 Neustädter Kirche, Eschwege
 Neustädter Kirche, Hannover
 Neustädter Kirche, Hofgeismar
 Neustädter Münster, Neustadt im Schwarzwald

See also
 Neustädter Marienkirche, Bielefeld